Sweet Harmony is the third solo studio album by Maria Muldaur. It was released in 1976 on the Reprise label. The album was produced by Joe Boyd and Lenny Waronker. It features J. J. Cale and Waddy Wachtel on guitar, Earl Palmer on drums, and others.

Track listing 
"Sweet Harmony" (Smokey Robinson) – 4:45
"Sad Eyes" (Neil Sedaka, Phil Cody) – 4:30
"Lying Song" (Kate McGarrigle) – 4:07
"Rockin' Chair" (Hoagy Carmichael) – 3:42
"I Can't Stand It" (Smokey McAllister) – 3:37
"We Just Couldn't Say Goodbye" (Harry Woods) – 3:35
"Back by Fall" (Wendy Waldman) – 3:55
"Jon the Generator" (John Herald) – 3:20
"Wild Bird" (Wendy Waldman) – 4:45
"As an Eagle Stirreth in Her Nest" (William Herbert Brewster) – 4:11

Personnel
Maria Muldaur - lead vocals
Amos Garrett, David Wilcox, Kenny Burrell, John Girton, David Nichtern, Waddy Wachtel - guitar
J.J. Cale - electric guitar and slide guitar on "Sad Eyes"
Bill Dickinson, Willie Weeks, Larry Gales, Michael Moore - bass
Michael Finnigan, James Booker, Joe Harnell, Bill Payne - piano
William Smith - Fender Rhodes electric piano
Earl Palmer, Russ Kunkel, Gary Mallaber - drums
Victor Feldman - vibraphone, congas, percussion
Marshall Royal, Plas Johnson - tenor saxophone
Sahib Shihab - baritone saxophone
John Rotella - clarinet
Benny Powell, Britt Woodman - trombone
Howard Johnson - tuba
Nick DeCaro - string arrangement on "Sweet Harmony"

References 

Maria Muldaur albums
Reprise Records albums
1976 albums
Albums produced by Joe Boyd
Albums produced by Lenny Waronker